I Do (But I Don't) is a 2004 American made-for-television romantic comedy film starring Denise Richards, Dean Cain, Karen Cliche, Olivia Palenstein and Mimi Kuzyk. It was directed by Kelly Makin and written by Cara Lockwood and Eric C. Charmelo. The film is based on the Cara Lockwood romance novel of the same name.

Plot 
Junior wedding planner Lauren Crandell (Denise Richards) is assigned a wedding for Darla Tedanski (Karen Cliche), the daughter of a prominent family by her boss Gennifer "G" (Jessica Walter), who promises her a long overdue promotion if she does well.

The next day, Lauren meets quirky, hunk firefighter Nick Corina (Dean Cain) when he rescues a groom from a failed 'grand entrance.' She feels an immediate attraction, but when Lauren accidentally meets Nick again that night, she sees Darla hanging on him. Yes, when she checks, Darla's groom is "James Nicholas Corina." She tries to forget Nick and focus on Darla's wedding plans while a bridal magazine interviews G, who takes sole credit for all their weddings - for which Lauren has done most of the work. Darla turns out to be a "Bridezilla", a controlling, egotistical child of privilege who has lost perspective about her wedding day.  Lauren's main relief is the humour and camaraderie of Mark (Barry Julien), Darla's long-suffering, overtly gay aide.
That night, Lauren's mother Cookie (Mimi Kuzyk) invites Lauren and Lauren's one-year-separated husband Brad (David Lipper) to dinner. Not knowing Brad cheated on Lauren, Cookie wants Lauren to give the marriage a second chance, but all Lauren wants is for Brad to stop stalling and sign the divorce papers she sent him weeks ago.

Cast
Denise Richards as Lauren Crandall
Dean Cain as Nick Corina
Karen Cliche as Darla Tedanski
Olivia Palenstein as Bonnie
Mimi Kuzyk as Cookie Crandall
Yannick Bisson as James "Jay" Corina
Barry Julien as Mark Stewart
David Lipper as Brad
Jessica Walter as Gennifer Douglas
Bruce Dinsmore as Robert
Tim Rozon as Rick Corina
Lisa Bronwyn Moore as Interviewer

References

External links 
 MyLifetime.com: I Do (But I Don't)
 
 
 

2004 television films
2004 films
2004 romantic comedy films
American romantic comedy films
American television films
Films about weddings
Films based on American novels
Films directed by Kelly Makin
2000s English-language films
2000s American films